South Launceston is a residential locality in the local government area (LGA) of Launceston in the Launceston LGA region of Tasmania. The 2016 census recorded a population of 4592 for the state suburb of South Launceston.
It is a suburb of Launceston, and also contains the minor suburbs of Glen Dhu and Sandhill (Five Ways).

History
South Launceston is a confirmed locality.
It started life as a small place called Galvin Town, by the 1890s it was included in Launceston as the suburb South Launceston.
In 1906 South Launceston grew to include Sandhill.

Geography
Almost all of the boundaries are survey lines.

Road infrastructure 
National Route 1 (Midland Highway) runs through from south-west to north.

References

Suburbs of Launceston, Tasmania
Localities of City of Launceston